Ways to Forget is the debut studio album of British indie rock group Clock Opera, released on 23 April 2012. Prior to the album, the band made singles for the songs "White Noise," "A Piece of String," "Once and for All" and "Belongings." An EP of "Lesson No.7" was released on 3 October 2011. The first single from the album was a new recording of "Once and for All" on 3 February 2012. An EP of "Man Made" and its remixes was released on 16 April 2012. "Belongings" was re-released on 30 July 2012. A single of "The Lost Buoys" was released for 5 November 2012.

Track listing

Personnel
Clock Opera
Guy Connelly – lead vocals, guitar, samples
Andy West – bass, guitar
Che Albrighton – drums
Dan Armstrong – keyboards, samples, backing vocals

Production
Guy Connelly – production and recording
Xavier Stephenson, assisted by Liam Nolan – recording drums on tracks 1–9 at Metropolis Studios
Matt Wills – recording drums on track 10 at The Square
Cenzo Townshend, assisted by Sean Julliard – mixing tracks 1–4 & 10
Dan Grech-Marguerat – mixing tracks 5–9
Richard Robinson – design and art direction
Mads Perch – photography
Jonathan Goddard, Gemma Nixon, Alexander Whitley, Malgorzata Dzierzon – dancers on album artwork

References

2012 debut albums
Island Records albums